A referendum on a new weapons law was held in Liechtenstein on 12 March 1950. The law had been passed by the Landtag, but was rejected by 72.3% of voters.

Results

References

1950 referendums
1950 in Liechtenstein
Referendums in Liechtenstein
March 1950 events in Europe